Coxton may refer to:

Places

United Kingdom
Coxton Tower, Scotland

United States
Coxton, Indiana, a community in Lawrence County, Indiana
Coxton, Kentucky, a community in Harlan County, Kentucky